Jeffrey J. Berger is an American Democratic politician in the state of Connecticut, representing the 73rd district in the Connecticut House of Representatives.

Personal life and education

Berger grew up in Waterbury, Connecticut, raised by father Joseph M. Berger, mother Phyllis Gualtieri Berger. He has one brother, Mitchell M. Berger. Berger, his wife, and sons reside in the Bunker Hill section of Waterbury.

Berger attended both public and private schools including John F. Kennedy High School and Millbrook School in Millbrook, New York. He studied at Springfield College in Springfield, Massachusetts, ultimately graduating from Eckerd College in St. Petersburg, Florida in 1978 with a double major: BS‚ Social Studies, and BA‚ Psychology, and receiving a Secondary Teaching certification. He completed post-graduate work at the University of New Haven, earning graduate credits toward an MBA. He is a realtor and former middle school teacher and coach, and is retired from the Waterbury Police Department after 20 years of service.

Community Involvement

Berger is a member of the Advisory Council North District Board of Education, Police Mutual Aid Society, Fraternal Order of ELKS BPO 265, past member Local #1237; CT Council of Police AFSCME, and a member of the Western Hills Golf and Social Club.

Berger led the charge for redevelopment and design of Bunker Hill Park, and The Ray Snyder Sr. Field at Municipal Stadium, Kaynor Technical School. He is a supporter of Brownfields re-mediation and development to fully utilize the space of the many closed and abandoned warehouses and factories in the city. He has also worked to increase and expand the film industry in Connecticut, increasing investments and movie production by over 200% since 2005.

Legislative Accomplishments

Berger is serving his fifth term in the Connecticut General Assembly. He is House Chair of the Commerce Committee and serves on the Finance, Revenue and Bonding; and Judiciary Committees.

Berger has co-sponsored and introduced proposed legislation regarding car tax reform for large municipalities, background checks for caregivers dealing with the mentally challenged, and a DNA database of samples taken from convicted felons.

Berger's accomplishments and awards include the Waterbury Police Department Medal of Excellence, Level IV Medal, I Ribbon with Star, 14 Departmental Commendations, FBI SWAT training, and Century-21 multimillion-dollar sales associate.

References 
 
http://www.housedems.ct.gov/Berger

http://berger4ct.com

1955 births
Living people
Politicians from Waterbury, Connecticut
Eckerd College alumni
Democratic Party members of the Connecticut House of Representatives
21st-century American politicians